James E. Craig could refer to: 

James Craig (police chief) (born 1956), American police official
, American destroyer escort launched in 1943, named for U.S. Navy officer James Edwin Craig

See also
James Craig (disambiguation)